Towhidi Muslim Janata is a term that refers to any group of people that forms an informal islamist organization in Bangladesh. These groups are mainly known for violent attacks on religious minorities in Bangladesh.

History 
On 8 April 2013, Al-Jazeera reported Towhidi Janata as a term referring to revolutionary people. In a November 2016 report, New Age stated Towhidi Janata to be something part of a national group backed up by Hefazat-e-Islam Bangladesh.

Bhola 

On 20 October 2019, activists of Towhidi Muslim Janata gathered at Borhanuddin upazila in Bhola and alleged that a local Hindu youth had defamed Islam on social media. The activists burned down the home a Hindu family and damaged 12 others. They engaged in violent clashes with the police which resulted in four deaths.Hefajat-e-Islam Bangladesh threatened the government with seize of Shapla Chattar if they did not take action against police personals who shot at Towhidi Muslim Janata activists in Bhola. Locals in Bhola alleged the slogans of Towhidi Muslim Janata were raised by activists of Bangladesh Nationalist Party and Bangladesh Jamaat-e-Islami.

Chandpur 
Towhidi Muslim Janata called for protests in Chandpur on 13 October 2021 following alleged desecration of the Quran. The protesters threw stones at a Hindu temple and clashed with the police resulting in 4 deaths and 50 people injured. They vandalized a Hindu temple. Police filed cases against 2400 people over the violent protests.

Banderban 
On 14 October 2021, activists of Towhidi Muslim Janata attacked and damaged Hindu homes and temple in Lama Bazar, Bandarban. The Police Bureau of Investigation was given the task to investigate the incident.

References 

Jihadist groups in Bangladesh
Terrorism in Bangladesh
Islamic terminology
Islam-related slurs